Ira Waddell Clokey (1878-1950) was an American mining engineer and botanist active in the western United States. He first studied at the University of Illinois, then moved to Harvard University, graduating with a Bachelor of Science in mining engineering in 1903. From 1904 to 1915, Clokey worked as a mining engineer in Mexico. In his spare time he collected plant specimens for his personal herbarium, which, however, was almost completely destroyed during a fire in 1912. In 1921, Clokey completed a Master of Science in plant pathology from Iowa State University. 

Clokey began intensive studies of the flora of the Charleston Mountains in southern Nevada in 1935. His book, Flora of the Charleston Mountains, Clark County, Nevada was accepted for publication just prior to his death in 1950.

The International Plant Names Index lists 44 plant names published by Ira Waddell Clokey.

List of plants named after him
A number of plants have been named in his honor:
Allium howellii var. clokeyi Ownbey & Aase, 1972
Astragalus oophorus var. clokeyanus Barneby, 1954
Castilleja clokeyi Pennell, 1938 (=Castilleja applegatei subsp. martinii (Abrams) T.I.Chuang & Heckard, 1992
Cirsium clokeyi S.F.Blake, 1938 (=Cirsium eatonii var. clokeyi (S.F.Blake) D.J.Keil, 2004)
Cryptantha clokeyi I.M.Johnst., 1939 (=Cryptantha muricata var. clokeyi (I.M.Johnst.) Jeps., 1943)
Ephedra clokeyi H.C.Cutler, 1939 (=Ephedra fasciculata var. clokeyi A.Nelson 1945)
Erigeron clokeyi Cronquist, 1947
Eriogonum heermannii var. clokeyi Reveal, 1976
Forsellesia clokeyi Ensign, 1942 (=Glossopetalon clokeyi (Ensign) H.St.John, 1942)
Gilia clokeyi H.Mason, 1942
Lupinus breweri var. clokeyanus C.P.Sm., 1940
Lupinus clokeyanus C.P.Sm., 1944 (=Lupinus argenteus var. palmeri (S.Watson) Barneby, 1986
Mertensia clokeyi Osterh., 1919 (=Mertensia lanceolata var. secundorum (Cockerell) Cockerell 1918)
Salvia dorrii var. clokeyi Strachan, 1982
Silene clokeyi C.L.Hitchc. & Maguire, 1947
Solanum clokeyi Munz, 1932

References

1878 births
1950 deaths
Botanists active in North America
20th-century American botanists
University of Illinois Urbana-Champaign alumni
Iowa State University alumni
Harvard School of Engineering and Applied Sciences alumni